Kristian Fjeld (16 February 1887 – 23 December 1976) was a Norwegian politician for the Labour Party. He was Minister of Agriculture from 1945 to 1951.

Fjeld comes from Vestre Toten, Oppland, but it was as a local politician for Stange and as a member of the parliament for Hedmark that he made his contributions to Norwegian politics.

During the occupation of Norway by Nazi Germany he was imprisoned in Hamar on 29 August 1942, and incarcerated in Grini concentration camp from 1 September 1942 to the war's end in May 1945.

References

1887 births
1976 deaths
Ministers of Agriculture and Food of Norway
Members of the Storting
Hedmark politicians
People from Vestre Toten
Labour Party (Norway) politicians
Norwegian resistance members
Grini concentration camp survivors
20th-century Norwegian politicians